Duricrust is a hard layer on or near the surface of soil. Duricrusts can range in thickness from a few millimeters or centimeters to several meters.

It is a general term (not to be confused with duripan) for a zone of chemical precipitation and hardening formed at or near the surface of sedimentary bodies through pedogenic and (or) non-pedogenic processes. It is typically formed by the accumulation of soluble minerals deposited by mineral-bearing waters that move upward, downward, or laterally by capillary action, commonly assisted in arid settings by evaporation. There are different types of duricrusts, each distinguished by a dominant mineralogy. For example, ferricrete (laterite) is dominated by sesquioxides of iron; alcrete (bauxite) is dominated by sesquioxides of aluminum; silcrete by silica; calcrete (caliche) by calcium carbonate, and gypcrete (gypcrust) it has a hardness of 7.3 by gypsum.

Duricrusts need to be formed in absolute accumulation, therefore they must have a source, transfer and precipitation.

Duricrust is often studied during missions to Mars because it may help prove the planet once had more water. Duricrust was found on Mars at the Viking 2 landing site, and a similar structure, nicknamed "Snow Queen", was found under the Phoenix landing site. Phoenix's duricrust was later confirmed to be water-based.

References

Further reading
 DILL, H.G., WEBER, B. and BOTZ, R. (2013) Metalliferous duricrusts (“orecretes”) - markers of weathering: A mineralogical and climatic-geomorphological approach to supergene Pb-Zn-Cu-Sb-P mineralization on different parent materials.- Neues Jahrbuch für Mineralogie Abhandlungen, 190: 123-195

External links
Description
NASA: The Sands of Mars

Soil